The 2018 Blancpain GT Series was the fifth season of the Blancpain GT Series. The season began on 7 April at Zolder and ended on 30 September in Barcelona. The season featured ten rounds, five Endurance Cup rounds and five Sprint Cup rounds.

Calendar
At the annual press conference during the 2017 24 Hours of Spa on 28 July, the Stéphane Ratel Organisation announced the first draft of the 2018 calendar. Zolder became the season opener instead of Misano. On 17 September 2017, it was announced the race at Silverstone was moved a week to avoid a clash with the Nürburgring 24 Hours. On 9 October 2017, the finalised calendar was announced, confirming the dates of the races at the Hungaroring.

Race format
In previous years a Sprint race weekend consisted of one Qualifying session, one Qualifying Race - of which the results set up the grid for the Main Race - and one Main Race. On 2 October 2017, changes to the format of Sprint race weekends were announced. In 2018 a Sprint race weekend consisted of two races scoring equal points and featuring separate Qualifying sessions for each race.

Race results
Bold indicates overall winner.

Championship standings
Scoring system
Championship points were awarded for the first ten positions in each race. The pole-sitter also received one point and entries were required to complete 75% of the winning car's race distance in order to be classified and earn points. Individual drivers were required to participate for a minimum of 25 minutes in order to earn championship points in any race. A new points system was introduced in the Sprint Cup this season. It takes the maximum points an entry could earn in the old 'Qualifying Race + Main Race'-format divided by two.

Sprint Cup Race points

Endurance Cup Race points

1000 km Paul Ricard points

24 Hours of Spa points
Points were awarded after six hours, after twelve hours and at the finish.

Drivers' championships

Overall

Silver Cup

Pro-Am Cup

Notes
1 – The No. 11 Kessel Racing Ferrari remained in race results at Monza, but was considered invisible and ineligible for points in the Drivers' and Teams' championships. Alessandro Pier Guidi was forced to exceed his maximum driver time, due to an injury suffered by his co-driver Michał Broniszewski in the paddock.

Am Cup

Teams' championships

Overall

Notes
1 – The No. 11 Kessel Racing Ferrari remained in race results at Monza, but was considered invisible and ineligible for points in the Drivers' and Teams' championships. Alessandro Pier Guidi was forced to exceed his maximum driver time, due to an injury suffered by his co-driver Michał Broniszewski in the paddock.

Pro-Am Cup

Notes
1 – The No. 11 Kessel Racing Ferrari remained in race results at Monza, but was considered invisible and ineligible for points in the Drivers' and Teams' championships. Alessandro Pier Guidi was forced to exceed his maximum driver time, due to an injury suffered by his co-driver Michał Broniszewski in the paddock.

Am Cup

See also
2018 Blancpain GT Series Endurance Cup
2018 Blancpain GT Series Sprint Cup
2018 Blancpain GT Series Asia

References

External links

 
GT World Challenge Europe
2018 in motorsport